Nadiashda or Nadejda Galli-Shohat (died March 6, 1948) was a Russian physicist. Born Nadiashda Kokaoulina in Siberia, she graduated from the Women's University of Petrograd in 1903, joined the Bolshevik Party after the 1905 Russian Revolution, and took the name Galli upon marrying her first husband. She received her doctorate from Göttingen in 1914, worked at the Yekaterinburg Meteorological Observatory from 1915 to 1917, and from 1917 to 1922 was professor and chair of the physics department at Ural Federal University, after which she worked at the University of Petrograd's State Optical Institute. Together with her second husband, the mathematician James Alexander Shohat, she migrated to the United States in 1923. She was elected a Fellow of the American Physical Society in 1931. She taught physics at the University of Michigan, Mount Holyoke, Rockford College, Bryn Mawr, and the University of Pennsylvania. 

In addition, Galli-Shohat is known for a biography of her nephew, the composer Dmitri Shostakovich, coauthored by her and Victor Seroff. Titled Dmitri Shostakovich: The Life And Background Of A Soviet Composer, it was published by Alfred A. Knopf in 1943. Galli-Shohat died on March 6, 1948, at the Graduate Hospital in Philadelphia.

References

20th-century Russian physicists
Women physicists
Fellows of the American Physical Society
Bryn Mawr College faculty
Mount Holyoke College faculty
University of Michigan faculty
University of Pennsylvania faculty
University of Göttingen alumni
Year of birth missing
1948 deaths